Bicycling with Molière is a 2013 French comedy-drama film directed by Philippe Le Guay. In January 2014, the film received three nominations at the 39th César Awards.

Cast
 Fabrice Luchini as Serge Tanneur
 Lambert Wilson as Gauthier Valence
 Maya Sansa as Francesca
 Camille Japy as Christine
 Ged Marlon as Meynard, l'agent immobilier
 Stéphan Wojtowicz as Le chauffeur de taxi
 Annie Mercier as Tamara, l'agent
 Christine Murillo as Mme Françon
 Josiane Stoléru as Raphaëlle La Puisaye

References

External links
 

2013 films
2013 comedy-drama films
French comedy-drama films
2010s French-language films
Films directed by Philippe Le Guay
Films set on islands
Films about actors
2010s French films